Glengowrie is a suburb of the Australian city of Adelaide, approximately 12 kilometres south west of the city centre. The name Glengowrie means "Glen of Gowrie", so called in honour of Lord Gowrie (formerly, Alexander Gore Arkwright Hore-Ruthven), Governor-General of Australia from 1936 to 1944.

Location
Located in the City of Marion, Glengowrie is bounded by the Glenelg tram line to the north, Morphett Road to the east, Oaklands Road to the south and parts of Diagonal Road, Panton Crescent and Buttrose Street to the west. The western tip of Glengowrie is approximately 2 kilometres from the beaches of Glenelg, one of Adelaide's best known beachside precincts.

The suburb occupies an area of 1.9 km2.

Demography

The suburb's population at the 2006 Census was approximately 4,720, of which slightly more than half (52.7%) were female. Around 15.9% of the suburb's residents were born overseas, with the five largest groups originating from England (6.6%), Scotland (1.1%), New Zealand (0.7%), Ireland (0.6%), and the Netherlands (0.5%). The most common languages other than English spoken at home were Greek (0.8%), Italian (0.6%), Serbian (0.3%), German (0.3%) and Japanese (0.3%).

There were 2,104 occupied private dwellings in the suburb, including: 1,352 detached, 468 semi-detached, 281 flats or apartments, and 3 'other'. Approximately 40.1% of occupied private dwellings were fully owned, 31.6% were being purchased and 19.2% were rented. The median weekly household income was $919, compared with $924 in Adelaide overall.

Governance
Glengowrie falls under the local-level governance of the City of Marion. It lies in the state electoral district of Morphett and the federal electoral division of Hindmarsh.

Amenities

 The Hazelmere Reserve is a public park on the southern edge of Glengowrie. It features the popular but controversial fenced off area known as "Dog Park" which is typically filled with dogs and their owners late in the afternoon and on weekends. The reserve is located on the site of the oval of the former Glengowrie High School.
 The Glengowrie Tram Depot houses the trams (launched in 1927) which service Adelaide's only remaining tramline from Adelaide to Glenelg.
 The Sturt River Linear Park is a trail which follows the Sturt River through the south-western metropolitan area from Marion to Glenelg. It crosses through the north-eastern tip of Glengowrie at site of Glenelg East Reserve off Fisk Avenue.
 Glengowrie High School first opened in 1969. It was closed and demolished in 1991 when the school body was amalgamated with Mitchell Park High School to form Hamilton Secondary College. The site is now occupied by the Glengowrie Retirement Estate and Hazelmere Reserve.

See also
 List of Adelaide suburbs

References

Suburbs of Adelaide